True Digital Security (formerly SLPowers) is an American information technology (IT) services provider with office in West Palm Beach, Florida, Tulsa, Oklahoma, and New York, New York. Its flagship service offering is a managed IT/Cloud and Security platform aimed at effectively managing small and medium business IT infrastructure systems based on the Windows, OS X, and Linux operating systems.

Company structure

1985 - 2018
SLPowers Computer Consultants Inc. was founded in 1985. It was acquired by A/G Technologies Inc. in March 2000 and continued doing business as simply "SLPowers." In June 2005, SLPowers acquired Boca Raton, Florida based Gator Technologies. Triggered by a corporate structure change, beginning 2010, SLPowers became the DBA (doing business as) for Extensible Computing LLC. Then, in 2015, Extensible Computing LLC became a wholly owned subsidiary of Network Security Partners LLC. This operating entity remained intact until March 2018, when Network Security Partners LLC (a Florida LLC) and True Digital Security Inc. (an Oklahoma Corporation) performed a true merger to form a new Delaware corporation, True Digital Security Inc. At that time, Extensible Computing LLC became a wholly owned subsidiary of the new True Digital Security Inc. and the name SLPowers was retired.

Acquisition
In January 2022, Cerberus Sentinel announced the acquisition of True Digital Security, which will continue operating as a wholly-owned subsidiary.

Services
SLPowers began as a traditional hardware VAR (value added reseller) and IT Professional Services company. In the late 1990s, before acquiring SLPowers, A/G Technologies Inc. had begun to develop its "flat rate service contract" which quickly evolved into a full IT management suite. In 2007, SLPowers was awarded an Industry Contribution Award by CompTIA, the Computing Technology Industry Association, for their pioneering work in IT managed services and for their willingness to share best practices with other IT services providers.

References

Companies based in Palm Beach County, Florida
Information technology companies of the United States
American companies established in 1985
Technology companies established in 1985